"The Ballroom Blitz" (often called "Ballroom Blitz") is a song by British glam rock band The Sweet, written by Nicky Chinn and Mike Chapman. The song reached number one in Canada, number two in the UK Singles Chart and the Australian Chart, and number five on the US Billboard Hot 100. It remains an enduring favourite, with more than 144 million streams on Spotify alone by the end of 2022.

Background

"The Ballroom Blitz" was inspired by an incident on 27 January 1973 when the band were performing at the Grand Hall in Kilmarnock, Scotland, and were driven offstage by a bottling.

History and description 
The song was recorded on 11-12 June 1973 at Audio International Studio, 18 Rodmarton Street, London,  and released as a single in September 1973.

The song appeared on the US and Canadian versions of Desolation Boulevard but never appeared on a Sweet album in the UK, other than hits compilations.

The initial guitar and drum riff of the song has similarity to a 1963 song by Bobby Comstock called "Let's Stomp".

Cover versions
An early cover of "The Ballroom Blitz" was by the Les Humphries Singers in 1974, the first German single to reach #1 in New Zealand. In 1979, the song was covered by the Damned, which featured Lemmy from Motörhead on bass guitar. It was released as a B-side to "I Just Can't Be Happy Today" and featured as a bonus track on their CD reissue of Machine Gun Etiquette. Other covers include Krokus in 1984, the Surf Punks on their 1988 album Oh No! Not Them Again (in the lyrics jacket it just says, "You should know the words by now"), Japanese glam rock band Scanch on their 1991 album Ultra Romantic Bombers for Unlimited Lovers under the title of "R&R Dynamite Kyoujidai", thrash metal band Nuclear Assault on their 1991 album Out of Order, Tia Carrere featuring a back track featuring Tommy Nickerson on the soundtrack to Wayne's World in 1992, and Christian rock band Calibretto 13 on their album Enter the Danger Brigade in 2000. In 2016, The Struts recorded it for the soundtrack of film The Edge of Seventeen. In 2021, White Denim published a cover of The Ballroom Blitz via Dropbox.

In popular culture
 
The song has appeared in many movies, including Wayne's World, Bordello of Blood, Romanzo Criminale, Daddy Day Care and The Sandlot: Heading Home.
 The words "she thinks she's the passionate one" from the song are dubbed into the Beastie Boys song "Hey Ladies".
 Ohi Ho Bang Bang (a one-off project of Holger Hiller, Karl Bonnie of Renegade Soundwave and video artist Akiko Hada) released a 12" single and a CD Video in 1988.  "The Three" (a remix of their song "The Two") samples "Ballroom Blitz" extensively, especially the drumming from the intro.
 Since June 2016, the song has been used in public information films on the subject of smart meters surrounding gas and electricity use in the United Kingdom.
The song was featured in the trailer for Season 3 of Netflix's Umbrella Academy.

Personnel
Brian Connolly – lead vocals
Steve Priest – bass guitar, backing vocals, spoken lead vocals
Andy Scott – guitar, backing vocals
Mick Tucker – drums, backing vocals

Chart performance

Weekly charts

Year-end charts

References

External links
 

1973 singles
1975 singles
Number-one singles in Germany
Irish Singles Chart number-one singles
Number-one singles in Australia
Number-one singles in New Zealand
RPM Top Singles number-one singles
The Sweet songs
Songs written by Mike Chapman
Songs written by Nicky Chinn
Song recordings produced by Mike Chapman
1973 songs
RCA Records singles
Capitol Records singles